Andrés Aldama Cabrera (born April 9, 1956) is a retired amateur Cuban boxer, who won the light welterweight silver medal at the 1976 Summer Olympics and the Welterweight gold medal at the 1980 Summer Olympics.

Aldama defeated John Mugabi of Uganda to win the 1980 gold medal, and lost to Sugar Ray Leonard of the United States to receive the 1976 silver medal. In 1979 he won a gold medal at the Pan American Games, defeating Mike McCallum of Jamaica in the welterweight final.

Olympic results
Below are the Olympic results of Andres Aldama, a Cuban boxer who competed in the 1976 Montreal Olympics as a light welterweight and in the 1980 Moscow Olympics as a welterweight:

Montreal - 1976
 Round of 64: 1st round bye
 Round of 32: Defeated Sabahattin Burcu (Turkey) referee stopped contest in round #2
 Round of 16: Defeated Jesus Sánchez (Dominican Republic) referee stopped contest in round #2
 Quarterfinal: Defeated József Nagy (Hungary) TKO 2
 Semifinal: Defeated Vladimir Kolev (Bulgaria) KO 1
 Final: Lost to Sugar Ray Leonard (United States) by decision, 0-5 (was awarded silver medal)

Moscow - 1980
 Round of 32: Defeated Pierre Sotoumey (Benin) TKO 3
 Round of 16: Defeated Israel Akopkokhyan (Soviet Union) by decision, 3-2
 Quarterfinal: Defeated Plamen Yankov (Bulgaria) KO 3
 Semifinal: Defeated Karl-Heinz Krüger (East Germany) by decision, 5-0
 Final: Defeated John Mugabi (Uganda) by decision, 4-1 (was awarded gold medal)

References

External links
Andrés Aldama Partial Record (Amateur Boxing Results)

Living people
Light-welterweight boxers
Welterweight boxers
1956 births
Boxers at the 1976 Summer Olympics
Boxers at the 1980 Summer Olympics
Olympic boxers of Cuba
Olympic gold medalists for Cuba
Olympic silver medalists for Cuba
Sportspeople from Matanzas
Olympic medalists in boxing
Boxers at the 1979 Pan American Games
Pan American Games gold medalists for Cuba
Cuban male boxers
Medalists at the 1980 Summer Olympics
Medalists at the 1976 Summer Olympics
Pan American Games medalists in boxing
Medalists at the 1979 Pan American Games